North Shore Technical High School was a public application-type high school located in the town of Middleton in the U.S. state of Massachusetts under the North Shore Regional Vocational School District. It served ninth through twelfth grade students from 16 communities all on the North Shore. They included Beverly, Boxford, Danvers, Essex, Gloucester, Hamilton, Lynnfield, Manchester-by-the-Sea, Marblehead, Middleton, Nahant, Rockport, Salem, Swampscott, Topsfield, and Wenham.  NST was the home to their logo and mascot, the bulldog.

On July 1, 2014, North Shore Tech merged with the Essex Agricultural and Technical High School to create Essex Technical High School located in the Hathorne section of Danvers, Massachusetts.

Class/technical structuring

The school operated on a rotating schedule that alternated between academic and technical studies weekly. A-Week began on a Monday, and ended on the end of Friday, while B-Week began on the upcoming Monday and alternated between weeks each Monday continuously throughout the school year. Prior to the 2011–12 school year, the schedule began on a Wednesday, and ending on the end Tuesday, before changing to B-Week, and alternating on Wednesdays.

Career/technical exploratory program

Upon completion of a twelve-week career/technical exploratory program during grade 9, students then selected one technical area in which they concentrated for the remaining three years. Technical programs, or shops rather, included Automotive Technology, Carpentry, Collision Repair, Design and Visual Communications, Cosmetology, Culinary Arts, Electrical, Graphic Arts, Health/Science Technology, Information Technology Services, Machine Technology, and Masonry.

In the news

"A teacher in Massachusetts was suspended without pay for potentially exposing his students to rabies when he skinned a coyote he found on the road in front of his students."

Notable alumni
 Mark Castillo - drummer for the band Crossfade

References

Schools in Essex County, Massachusetts
Public high schools in Massachusetts
Wenham, Massachusetts